Rita Briggs ["Maude"] (March 27, 1929 – September 6, 1994) was an American female baseball catcher who played from  through  for seven different teams in the All-American Girls Professional Baseball League. She was born in Ayer, Massachusetts.

Brief profile
An All-Star and member of two champion teams, Briggs was a solid backup catcher during the last years of existence of the All-American Girls Professional Baseball League. Known more for her glove work than her bat, she had a strong throwing arm and worked well with pitchers, important in a league that progressively expanded the length of the base paths and pitching distance and decreased the size of the ball until the final year of play. A consistent and durable player, she recorded an all-time mark for most games played by a catcher in a single season. Besides this, she provided versatility being able to play all outfield positions and first base while being a left-hitter.

Early life
Briggs started to play baseball at a very early age. She attended Ayer High School, where she was the full-time catcher for the Ayer baseball team to become the first and only girl ballplayer in the school's history. Briggs was discovered by an AAGPBL scout while she was playing at school and give her a tryout. Briggs did well, and was given a contract to play in the 1947 season. This time the league opened its spring training in Havana, Cuba.

AAGPBL career
Briggs entered the league in 1947 with the Rockford Peaches, playing for them one and a half years before joining the Chicago Colleens (1948), South Bend Blue Sox (1949), Racine Belles (1949), Peoria Redwings (1949-'51), Battle Creek Belles (1952) and Fort Wayne Daisies (1953-'54). She hit .215 in limited action during her rookie season. In 1948 she batted .200 for Rockford and Chicago with a career-high 43 stolen bases and seven triples (third in the league). She caught 128 games that year, to set an all-time record for most games played by a catcher in a single season.

Playing for three clubs in 1949, Briggs hit a combined .222 average with 22 steals before becoming a regular with Peoria for the next two years. Her most productive season came in 1951, when she posted career-highs in average (.275), runs scored (57) and runs batted in (44). After that she helped the Daisies to win pennants in 1953 and 1954, but the team lost the final series in both years to the Grand Rapids Chicks and Kalamazoo Lassies, respectively. She was named to the All-Star Team in 1952, and shared catching duties with Pepper Paire in 1954, during what turned out to be the All-American League's final season.

In November 1988, the AAGPBL received their long overdue recognition when the Baseball Hall of Fame and Museum in Cooperstown, New York dedicated a permanent display to the entire league rather than any individual player.

Rita Briggs spent the last years of her life in Kalamazoo, Michigan, where she died at the age of 65. In 2009, Ayer High School dedicated to her their new softball park Rita Briggs Field.

Statistics

Batting

Fielding

Sources

All-American Girls Professional Baseball League players
Rockford Peaches players
Chicago Colleens players
South Bend Blue Sox players
Peoria Redwings players
Battle Creek Belles players
Fort Wayne Daisies players
Racine Belles (1943–1950) players
Baseball catchers
Sportspeople from Kalamazoo, Michigan
People from Ayer, Massachusetts
Sportspeople from Middlesex County, Massachusetts
Baseball players from Massachusetts
1929 births
1994 deaths
20th-century American women